Robert Byrd Jordan III (October 11, 1932 – February 16, 2020) was an American politician who served as the 29th Lieutenant Governor of North Carolina for one term (1985–1989) under Governor James G. Martin and who unsuccessfully ran for Governor of North Carolina in 1988.

Jordan, a native of Mount Gilead, North Carolina, graduated from North Carolina State University in 1954 with honors in forestry. Prior to being elected lieutenant governor, Jordan ran his family's lumber company and served in the North Carolina Senate as a Democrat from 1976 to 1984.

In 1984, he defeated state House Speaker Carl J. Stewart, Jr. in a hard-fought Democratic primary, then defeated Republican John H. Carrington in the general election to become North Carolina's 29th lieutenant governor. He easily won the 1988 gubernatorial nomination but lost the general election to incumbent James G. Martin.

An advocate of education, Jordan has served on the North Carolina Board of Education, the state Board of Community Colleges, and the University of North Carolina System Board of Governors. On May 20, 2009, Jordan was elected chairman of the Trustees of North Carolina State University to serve the remaining term of McQueen Campbell, who resigned in conjunction with the investigation of Mike Easley.

Jordan Hall at North Carolina State University was named after his family.

Jordan died on February 16, 2020, at his home in Mount Gilead, North Carolina.

References

External links
NC Notable Bob Jordan
North Carolina Award citation
OurCampaigns.com
Jordan elected chairman of NCSU trustees

|-

Democratic Party North Carolina state senators
Lieutenant Governors of North Carolina
North Carolina State University alumni
People from Mount Gilead, North Carolina
1932 births
2020 deaths
20th-century American politicians